Ettumanoorappan College, in Ettumanoor, India was established in 1995, is owned by Ettumanoor Education Society, which is registered under the Charitable Societies Act 1985. The College is affiliated to Mahatma Gandhi University.

Departments
Business Administration
Commerce
Computer Science
Economics
English
Hindi
Library Science
Malayalam
Mathematics

Accreditation
Affiliated to Mahatma Gandhi University, Kottayam, Kerala.

References

External links
https://www.mgu.ac.in/affiliated-colleges/
https://ettumanoorappancollege.edu.in/
http://wikimapia.org/14379566/ETTUMANOORAPPAN-COLLEGE

Colleges affiliated to Mahatma Gandhi University, Kerala
Universities and colleges in Kottayam district
1995 establishments in Kerala